Drakaea micrantha, commonly known as the dwarf hammer orchid is a species of orchid endemic to the south–west of Western Australia. It is similar to other hammer orchids in that it is pollinated by a single species of male thynnid wasp using sexual deception. The orchid's labellum is similar in shape and scent to a flightless female thynnid wasp. The species is only known from a scattered populations in the south west of the state and has been declared "vulnerable" by the Australian government and "threatened" by the government of Western Australia.

Description 
Drakaea micrantha is similar to others in the genus in that it has a single, ground hugging leaf and an underground tuber.

Its flower is also similar to those of other hammer orchids in that the labellum resembles a flightless female thynnid wasp however it can be distinguished by having a spine on the column, and a labellum with a straight end and a narrow "neck". The insect-like labellum has a head about half as long as the body and is hairy for at least half its length. The "body" of the labellum is dark-coloured, slightly swollen and has a few hairs. Flowers appear in September and October.

Taxonomy and naming 
Drakaea micrantha was first formally described by Stephen Hopper and Andrew Brown in 2007. Their description was published in Australian Systematic Botany. The specific epithet (micrantha) is derived from the Ancient Greek μικρός (mikrós) meaning "small" or "little" and ἄνθος (ánthos) meaning "flower", referring to the flower of this species being the smallest of the genus.

Distribution and habitat 
The dwarf hammer orchid occurs at Perth, Augusta and Porongurup National Park It grows in bare sand in woodland, often near Kunzea glabrescens thickets.

Conservation 
Drakaea micrantha is known from 32 small, scattered populations and the total population of mature plants was estimated in 2007 to be about 514. The Western Australian Government Department of Parks and Wildlife classifies the species as "threatened" meaning that it is considered likely to become extinct, or rare and in need of special protection. The Australian Government lists its status under the Environmental Protection and Biodiversity Conservation Act as "vulnerable". The main threat to the species' survival is fire during its growing and flowering stages between June and early October.

References 

micrantha
Orchids of Western Australia
Endemic orchids of Australia
Plants described in 2007
Endemic flora of Southwest Australia
Taxa named by Stephen Hopper